Yaransky District is an administrative and municipal district (raion), one of the thirty-nine in Kirov Oblast, Russia. It is located in the southwest of the oblast. Its administrative center is the town of Yaransk. Population:  33,682 (2002 Census);  The population of Yaransk accounts for 64.1% of the district's total population.

References

Notes

Sources

Districts of Kirov Oblast